S. Coleman Charlton was one of the founders of Iron Crown Enterprises (ICE).

Career
While running a six-year Dungeons & Dragons campaign set in Middle-earth, Pete Fenlon began developing a set of house rules with Charlton and Kurt Fischer, ultimately forming Iron Crown Enterprises in 1980 to publish their set of rules. Charlton was one of the designers of the Rolemaster role-playing game system in 1980. In 1984 he simplified the Rolemaster set of rules in order to create MERP, the first Middle-earth role-playing game, also edited by ICE.

Charlton designed the Middle-earth Collectible Card Game, which was published in 1995, after ICE recovered the licensing rights that they had previously signed over to Wizards of the Coast. Charlton and Fenlon later oversaw Mayfair Games.

See also 
Iron Crown Enterprises
Mayfair Games
The Settlers of Catan

References

External links 
 Boardgame Geek
 Bio at Mayfair Games
 Richmond Times-Dispatch coverage of ICE

Living people
Role-playing game designers
Year of birth missing (living people)